Marconi/Arcade station is a side platformed Sacramento RT light rail station in Sacramento, California, United States. The station was opened on March 12, 1987, and is operated by the Sacramento Regional Transit District as part of the Blue Line. The Arcade portion in the station name comes from the surrounding neighborhood of Arden-Arcade.

Platforms and tracks

References

External links
http://www.sacrt.com/TLC/NortheastLine/EconomicProfiles/Marconi.PDF

Sacramento Regional Transit light rail stations
Railway stations in the United States opened in 1987